The Twelve Old Summer Palace bronze heads are a collection of bronze fountainheads in the shape of the Chinese zodiac animals that were part of a water clock fountain in front of the Haiyantang building of the Xiyang Lou (Western style mansions) area of the Old Summer Palace in Beijing. Believed to have been designed by the Jesuit Giuseppe Castiglione for the Qianlong Emperor, the statues would spout out water from their mouths to tell the time.

The bronze-cast heads of the stone statues were among the treasures looted during the destruction of the Old Summer Palace by British and French expeditionary forces in 1860 during the Second Opium War. Since then, they have been among the most visible examples of attempts to repatriate Chinese art and cultural artifacts. Two of the heads, the rat and the rabbit, were formerly held by French fashion designer Yves Saint Laurent and were the subject of an international scandal (2009 auction of Old Summer Palace bronze heads).

The Poly Museum (New Beijing Poly Plaza), a museum in Beijing owned and operated by China Poly Group Corporation, a state-owned Chinese business group enterprise, is filled with repatriated artworks, including several of the animal fountainheads. China Poly bought the tiger, monkey, and ox through auction houses in Hong Kong in 2000, while the pig’s head was recovered in New York by Hong Kong casino magnate Stanley Ho, who in turn donated it to the Poly Museum.

The CEO of Poly Culture (an offshoot of China Poly Group focused on art-repatriation and antiquities), Jiang Yingchun, has been quoted as saying: "The heads represent our feelings for the entire nation; we love them and we weep for them. We can try many ways to get the heads back. The auction is just one method. We can't ignore that the art was taken illegally,” even if it was being well cared for, he said. “If you kidnapped my children and then treated them well, the crime is still not forgiven."

Current status

In culture
 Ai Weiwei in 2010 created his own interpretation of 12 heads "The Circle of Animals/Zodiac Heads", where 5 were recreated. It exists in bronze and gold versions. Sold for $4.4 million.

CZ12 (2012) -  Jackie Chan's movie about treasure hunting.

See also
2009 auction of Old Summer Palace bronze heads
State Administration of Cultural Heritage

References

External links

 International Herald Tribute, Auction Houses Add Insult to Injury, May 6, 2000
 Press Release: Bronze animals heads from Summer Palace go on display, Hong Kong, Heritage Museum Friday, January 9, 2004
 Macao casino mogul Stanley Ho buys stolen Chinese relic for US$8.9 million 21 September, 2007
 BBC report of February 2009 auction {rat & rabbit}
 BBC report/photographs of 4 of 5 bronze heads recovered prior to 2009 auction {OX, Tiger. Monkey, Pig}
 report/photograph of the Haiyantang Horse head statute

Art and cultural repatriation
Demolished buildings and structures in China
Qing dynasty
Chinese astrology
Chinese architectural history
Old Summer Palace